Bart Mastronardi is an American director, screenwriter, cinematographer and producer.  He resides in New York City, teaching Camera, Lighting, and Director's craft at the prestigious New York Film Academy. His debut feature  Vindication garnered accolades from magazines such as Fangoria Magazine and awards at various international film festivals.

Filmography

References 

Fangoria Magazine 'Gay of the Dead' - Bart Mastronardi's Vindication Part I  https://web.archive.org/web/20130207002342/http://fangoria.com/index.php/blogs/gay-of-the-dead/311-gay-of-the-dead-vindication-writerdirector-bart-mastronardi-part-one

Fangoria Magazine 'Gay of the Dead' - Bart Mastronardi's Vindication  Part II  https://web.archive.org/web/20130205045225/http://fangoria.com/index.php/blogs/gay-of-the-dead/357-gay-of-the-dead-vindication-writerdirector-bart-mastronardi-part-two

Slant Magazine  "Birth is always painful" https://web.archive.org/web/20100521110739/http://www.slantmagazine.com/house/2009/05/birth-is-always-painful-an-interview-with-vindication-writerdirector-bart-mastronardi/

The Horror Society - Article - http://www.horrorsociety.com/2009/05/29/bart-mastronardi-interview/

American film directors
American cinematographers
Year of birth missing (living people)
Living people